Dexter is a town in Laurens County, Georgia, United States. As of the 2010 census it had a population of 575, up from 509 at the 2000 census. It is part of the Dublin Micropolitan Statistical Area.

History
The first permanent settlement at Dexter was made in 1889. A post office has been in operation at Dexter since 1890. The Georgia General Assembly incorporated the place in 1891 as the "Town of Dexter".

Geography
Dexter is located in western Laurens County at  (32.434580, -83.058904). Georgia State Route 257 is the town's Main Street; the highway leads northeast  to Dublin, the county seat, and southwest  to Chester. State Route 338 leads north  to Dudley and south  to Cadwell.

The town sits on a low ridge between Boggy Branch to the north and Stitchihatchie Creek to the south. Both streams flow northeast to Rocky Creek, part of the Oconee River watershed.

Demographics

2020 census

As of the 2020 United States census, there were 655 people, 271 households, and 215 families residing in the town.

2000 census
As of the census of 2000, there were 509 people, 207 households, and 143 families residing in the town. The racial makeup of the town was 77.41% White and 22.59% African American. Hispanic or Latino of any race were 0.20% of the population.

There were 207 households, out of which 31.4% had children under the age of 21 living with them, 58.0% were married couples living together, 9.7% had a female householder with no husband present, and 30.9% were non-families. 29.0% of all households were made up of individuals, and 21.3% had someone living alone who was 65 years of age or older.  The average household size was 2.46 and the average family size was 3.05.

In the town, the population was spread out, with 26.9% under the age of 21, 7.1% from 21 to 24, 23.0% from 25 to 44, 23.0% from 45 to 64, and 20.0% who were 65 years of age or older.  The median age was 40 years. For every 100 females, there were 82.4 males.  For every 100 females age 21 and over, there were 82.4 males.

The median income for a household in the town was $33,036, and the median income for a family was $44,107. Males had a median income of $30,357 versus $26,375 for females. The per capita income for the town was $22,451.  About 10.4% of families and 14.7% of the population were below the poverty line, including 15.7% of those under age 21 and 31.6% of those age 65 or over.

References

Towns in Laurens County, Georgia
Towns in Georgia (U.S. state)
Dublin, Georgia micropolitan area